Devasthal is an observatory in the district of Nainital, Kumaon, India.  The literal meaning of the place is "abode of god".  The observatory is situated in the Kumaon Himalayas at an altitude of 2450 meters. Devasthal peak is an emerging optical astronomical site for Indian telescopes. Currently, a 130-cm optical telescope is working at the site. The sites are managed by the Aryabhatta Research Institute of Observational Sciences (ARIES), Nainital.

The site has already received a 360-cm telescope and a 400-cm liquid mirror telescope which is under construction & likely to be completed by the year 2022.  A survey for installing solar telescope is also being carried out near the peak.  The place is well equipped with guest house, canteen, internet connection, water and electric supply since 2008.

Devasthal is located 9 km from Dhanachuli, the nearest town in Nainital district.

See also 
 List of astronomical observatories

References 

Nainital district
Astronomical observatories in India
1998 establishments in Uttar Pradesh
Scientific organizations established in 1998